Is It Possible? is a three-episode documentary television series on the Discovery Channel that features people, animals, technology, and other things that are real, but so unusual and surprising that they seem impossible.

The series is narrated by Robert Lee, who is also the narrator for Mythbusters. Executive producer is Dan Jbara.

The first episode aired on March 24, 2010, and included a contortionist, a blind man who uses echolocation, microscopic art by Willard Wigan, the fish Macropinna microstoma, a lyrebird, a man who roller skated on a roller coaster, and several other subjects.

Episodes

See also
 That's Incredible!
 Stan Lee's Superhumans

External links
 Is It Possible? videos at the Discovery Channel
  Is It Possible on Internet Movie Database

2010 American television series debuts
2010 American television series endings
2010s American documentary television series
Discovery Channel original programming